This list of Vogue Hong Kong cover models is a catalog of cover models who have appeared on the cover of Vogue Hong Kong, Hong Kong's edition of Vogue magazine, starting with the magazine's first issue in March 2019.

2019

2020

2021

2022

2023

External links 
 Vogue Hong Kong Official Site

Hong Kong
Vogue
Hong Kong fashion